BEACOPP is a chemotherapy regimen for treatment of Hodgkin lymphoma developed by the German Hodgkin Study Group used for patients in Stages > II or early (IA or IB) with unfavorable risk factors.
Patients typically receive treatment in cycles of 21 days with no drugs given on days 15–21.
There also exists a more intensive regimen with cycles of 14 days. Usually a course of BEACOPP therapy consists of four, sometimes six to eight cycles, or in combination with ABVD.
In some countries BEACOPP still is experimental, in others (e.g. Germany and Austria) it is a standard therapy. In the United States, ABVD (or Stanford V) is generally given instead, because BEACOPP is perceived by practicing oncologists to have the potential to induce more secondary neoplasias (such as leukemias).  However, the final results from the GHSG HD14 trial indicate that "there
were no overall differences in treatment-related mortality or secondary malignancies" of BEACOPP relative to ABVD.

Oncologists in the US have also used the BEACOPP regimen relatively less for cost reasons:
 Twice as many infusion per cycle relative to ABVD;
 Requirement for G-CSF support, which was under patent protection in the US as late as 2013 (as Neupogen by Amgen), while that patent protection expired in the EU in 2008;
 Higher likelihood of adverse events requiring hospitalization, such as infection or acute toxicity;

However, BEACOPP delivers approximately 7% points success relative to ABVD for early unfavorable Hodgkin's disease (as measured five-year freedom from treatment failure) and 12% points greater success relative to ABVD for advanced Hodgkin's disease (Stage IIB with risk factors or stages III and IV) as measured by seven-year freedom from treatment failure.

Predecessors of BEACOPP were COPP and (the earliest) MOPP.

Dosing regimen

See also
 Stanford V
 ABVD

References 

Chemotherapy regimens used in lymphoma
Hodgkin lymphoma